Talinum paniculatum is a succulent subshrub in the family Talinaceae that is native to much of North and South America, and the Caribbean countries. It is commonly known as fameflower, Jewels-of-Opar (a name borrowed from the title of the novel Tarzan and the Jewels of Opar by Edgar Rice Burroughs), or pink baby's-breath.

Classification
The species was described in 1760 under the basionym of Portulaca paniculata by Nicolaus Joseph von Jacquin (1727–1817), then recombined in the genus Talinum in 1791 by Joseph Gaertner (1732–1791). In current classification, Talinum paniculatum belongs to the family Talinaceae, it was assigned in the past to the family of the purslane or Portulacaceae.

Appearance 
Talinum paniculatum bears tuberous roots and panicles of flowers and produces tiny, jewel-like fruits. Its peculiarity is its very long root, of orange colour , that reaches about 80 centimeters. It is a very bad herb in crops, and it proliferates very easily, since it roots very easily, even after it has been plucked and if it has any part of the root in contact with the soil. The plant as a whole can reach almost 2 meters high measured from the soil surface, where after maturity, its brown seeds (in abundance), spread easily through the surrounding area.

Native range
Talinum paniculatum is native to the southern United States, much of Latin America (such as Paraguay and Uruguay) and the Caribbean. It has been introduced notably in Africa and Asia.

Uses 
Talinum paniculatum is often grown as an ornamental plant. Cultivars include 'Kingwood Gold', 'Limón', and 'Variegatum'.
The leaves are edible and have been used in traditional medicine in Asia.

Used in home medicine as a diuretic, healing, emollient, vulval and anti-infective, it is also consumed in salads.

Gallery

References

External links

Flora of North America, Talinum paniculatum (Jacquin) Gaertner, 1791. Pink baby-breath, jewels of Opar, rama del sapo 
Talinum paniculatum (Jacq.) Gaertn., Finnish Museum of Natural History
photo of herbarium specimen at Missouri Botanical Garden, collected in Peru in 2012

Caryophyllales
Plants described in 1760
Taxa named by Nikolaus Joseph von Jacquin
Flora of North America
Flora of South America
Flora of Central America
Flora of the Caribbean
Flora without expected TNC conservation status